McQuady is an unincorporated community in Breckinridge County, Kentucky, United States. McQuady has a post office with ZIP code 40153.

Its original name was "Jolly Station", for Nelson Jolly, a local landowner. It was named for the town's first postmaster, Anne McQuady.

A line of the Louisville, Hardinsburg, & Western Railroad used to run through the town.  It eventually became a branch of the Louisville, Henderson, & St. Louis Railroad.

References

Unincorporated communities in Breckinridge County, Kentucky
Unincorporated communities in Kentucky